The 21st Toronto International Film Festival (TIFF) took place in Toronto, Ontario, Canada between September 5 and September 14, 1996.Deepa Mehta's Fire was selected as the opening film.

Awards

Programme

Gala Presentation
Shine by Scott Hicks
Life by Lawrence Johnston
The Daytrippers by Greg Mottola
Color of a Brisk and Leaping Day by Christopher Münch
The Watermelon Woman by Cheryl Dunye
Trees Lounge by Steve Buscemi
Unhook the Stars by Nick Cassavetes
Big Night by Campbell Scott, Stanley Tucci 
Breaking the Waves by Lars von Trier
The Quiet Room by Rolf de Heer
Ridicule by Patrice Leconte
Beautiful Thing by Hettie MacDonald 
Prisoner of the Mountains by Sergei Bodrov
The Funeral by Abel Ferrara
Jude by Michael Winterbottom
Fly Away Home by Carroll Ballard
Swingers by Doug Liman
That Thing You Do! by Tom Hanks
Albino Alligator by Kevin Spacey
Grace of My Heart by Allison Anders
Ponette by Jacques Doillon 
A Summer's Tale by Eric Rohmer
Goodbye South, Goodbye by Hou Hsiao-hsien
Bound by Lilly Wachowski & Lana Wachowski
Mother by Albert Brooks
Floating Life by Clara Law
A Summer in La Goulette by Férid Boughedir
2 Days in the Valley by John Herzfeld
Some Mother's Son by Terry George
Deep Crimson by Arturo Ripstein
Box of Moonlight by Tom DiCillo
Vesna va veloce by Carlo Mazzacurati
Forgotten Silver by Peter Jackson & Costa Botes
Kama Sutra: A Tale of Love by Mira Nair
Bastard Out of Carolina by Anjelica Huston
American Buffalo by Michael Corrente
La bouche de Jean-Pierre by Lucile Hadžihalilović
Engelchen by Helke Misselwitz
Kolya by Jan Svěrák

Canadian Perspective
Bogus by Norman Jewison
Can I Get a Witness? by Kris Lefcoe
Cat Swallows Parakeet And Speaks! by Ileana Pietrobruno
The Cockroach that Ate Cincinnati by Michael McNamara
The Escort (L'Escorte) by Denis Langlois
Fire by Deepa Mehta
The Human Plant (La Plante humaine) by Pierre Hébert
Hustler White by Bruce LaBruce
Kissed by Lynne Stopkewich
Letters from Home by Mike Hoolboom
Lilies by John Greyson
Lodela by Philippe Baylaucq
Long Day's Journey into Night by David Wellington
Lulu by Srinivas Krishna
Moscow Summer by Robin Schlaht
Not Me! (Sous-sol) by Pierre Gang
Power by Magnus Isacsson
Project Grizzly by Peter Lynch
Shoemaker by Colleen Murphy
Sin Cycle by Jack Cocker & Ben Famiglietti
Soft Like Me by Jeffrey Erbach
Trouble by Paul diStefano

Midnight Madness
Curdled by Reb Braddock
Killer Tongue by Alberto Sciamma
Road Movie by Peter Care
Organ by Kei Fujiwara
The Stendhal Syndrome by Dario Argento
All of Them Witches by Daniel Gruener
Ratchet by John Johnson
Screwed by Alexander Crawford
Attack of Legion by Shusuke Kaneko

Vietnam Perspective
When the Tenth Month Comes by Đặng Nhật Minh
The Retired General by Nguyễn Khắc Lợi
Gone, Gone Forever Gone by Hồ Quang Minh
Black Cactuses by Lê Dân
Nostalgia for Countryside by Đặng Nhật Minh

Documentaries
Looking for Richard by Al Pacino
Microcosmos by Marie Pérennou & Claude Nuridsany
Mondani a mondhatatlant: Elie Wiesel üzenete by Judit Elek
A Tickle in the Heart by Stefan Schwietert

References

External links
 Official site
 TIFF: A Reel History: 1976 - 2012
1996 Toronto International Film Festival at IMDb

1996
1996 film festivals
1996 in Toronto
1996 in Canadian cinema